Minuscule 809 (in the Gregory-Aland numbering), A149 (von Soden), is a Greek minuscule manuscript of the New Testament written on parchment. Palaeographically it has been assigned to the 11th century. The manuscript has complex contents.

Description 
The codex contains the text of the four Gospels, on 284 parchment leaves (size ).

The text is written in one column per page, 18-20 lines per page.
The biblical text is surrounded by a catena.

There is also division according to the Ammonian Sections (in Mark 233, the last section in 16:8), with references to the Eusebian Canons.

Text 
The Greek text of the codex is a representative of the Byzantine text-type. Aland placed it in Category V.

It was not examined according to the Claremont Profile Method.

History 
According to Gregory the manuscript was written in the 11th century. The manuscript is currently dated by the INTF to the 11th century.

It was added to the list of New Testament manuscripts by Gregory (809e). Gregory saw the manuscript in 1886.

The manuscript is now housed at the library of the National Library of Greece (2364) in Athens.

See also 

 List of New Testament minuscules
 Biblical manuscript
 Textual criticism
 Minuscule 808

References

Further reading

External links 
 Minuscule 809 at the National Library of Greece

Greek New Testament minuscules
11th-century biblical manuscripts
Manuscripts of the National Library of Greece